The 1899 Clemson Tigers football team represented Clemson Agricultural College—now known as Clemson University–during the 1899 Southern Intercollegiate Athletic Association football season.  The Tigers completed their fourth season with a record of 4–2, with wins over Davidson, South Carolina, North Carolina A&M, and Georgia Tech and losses to Georgia and Auburn.  Clemson did not host any games, but played a mix of away and neutral site games.  Walter Riggs served again as coach, having also led the team in its inaugural 1896 season, while J. N. Walker was the captain.

Schedule

References

Clemson
Clemson Tigers football seasons
Clemson Tigers football